United Nations Security Council Resolution 2165 was passed by a unanimous vote on 14 July 2014, and allows direct humanitarian access across four border crossings not controlled by the Syrian government.

It supplemented United Nations Security Council Resolution 2139 passed on February 22, 2014, which called on all parties in the Syrian Civil War to permit free access to humanitarian aid.

External links 

 Text of the Resolution at undocs.org

References 

 2165
2014 United Nations Security Council resolutions
2014 in Syria